Gabriele Volpi (born 29 June 1943) is an Italian-born Nigerian businessman, active in various sectors in Nigeria and Angola, the owner of the Italian football club Spezia Calcio and the former owner of Croatian football club HNK Rijeka.

Early life
Gabriele Volpi was born in Recco, province of Genoa, Italy on 29 June 1943.

Career
He moved to Nigeria in the 1970s, and became a naturalized citizen.

His holding company Orlean Invest Holding includes all of his Nigerian businesses including Intels Oilfield, Port Harcourt.

Gabriele Volpi (Male Residence Hall) at the American University of Nigeria is named after him.

Sports clubs
Volpi owns the Italian Serie A football club Spezia Calcio and the Italian water polo club Pro Recco. From September 2013 until December 2017 he was also the owner of the Croatian football club HNK Rijeka.

Personal life
He is married to Rosi Volpi, and has two sons, Simone and Matteo, who both work in his businesses.

Volpi owned a 60-metre yacht, Givi.

Currently owns the 75-metre yacht, "Boadicea".

References

1943 births
Italian businesspeople
Living people
Nigerian businesspeople
People from the Province of Genoa
People named in the Panama Papers
HNK Rijeka chairmen and investors
Nigerian people of Italian descent
Naturalized citizens of Nigeria